The Cats and the Fiddle was an African American singing group formed in 1937 in Chicago and active until 1951, releasing more than 30 gramophone sides during the period. Their instrumentation included a bass (the "fiddle" of the title), tenor guitar, ukulele and Martin tiple, a 10-string ukulele-family instrument.

Their signature song "I Miss You So" has been covered by many artists.

Members 

Over the course of years the Cats and the Fiddle experienced a large change over in its members. Below is a list of every person who was a member at some point.

 Jimmy Henderson (First Tenor)
 Ernie Price (Second Tenor)
 Chuck Barksdale (Bass) 
 Austin Powell (Lead Singer)
 Herbie Mills (Lead Singer)
 Lloyd "Tiny" Grimes (First Tenor and guitar)
 George Stienbeck (Bass) 
 Mifflin "Pee Wee" Branford (First Tenor)
 Hank Haslett (Lead Singer)
 Emmitt Slay (First Tenor)
 Johnny Davis (First Tenor)
 Stanley Gaines (Bass)
 Shirley Moore (Singer)
 Doris Knighton (Singer)

Musical career 

The original members consisted of Jimmy Henderson (First Tenor), Ernie Price (Second Tenor), Chuck Barksdale (Bass), and Austin Powell (Lead Singer). They were first discovered in 1939 when they were spotted by Lester Melrose, a representative for Victor Records while performing in Chicago. They were signed to Bluebird Records and released their first single "Nuts To You" b/w "Killin' Jive" in August of that year. They were also featured in the film Going Places, singing the song "Jeepers Creepers" with Louis Armstrong.

In 1940, their first real hit came with the song "I Miss You So", a mid-tempo ballad penned by Jimmy Henderson which was later redone by the Orioles at a slower tempo. At this time Jimmy Henderson died from meningitis and was replaced briefly by Herbie Mills (a former member of the Harlem Harmony Hounds along with Austin Powell) in July 1940 until Tiny Grimes replaces him in January 1941. Shortly after, tragedy struck again and Chuck Barksdale died and was replaced by George Stienbeck.

"I Miss You So" (written by  Bertha Scott, Jimmy Henderson and Sid Robin) eventually became their best known song, it has been covered by many artists, like Paul Anka (1959 single release), Little Anthony and the Imperials (1965 single release), Charles Brown, Barry Young, Nat King Cole Trio, Tony Scotti, Earl Grant, Julie London (on Love Letters), Connie Francis, Diana Krall (on Love Scenes), Jermaine Jackson, Kay Starr (on Losers, Weepers), Mel Carter, Charlie Rich, Mickey Gilley, Chris Connor, Etta Jones (on Lonely and Blue), and The Mills Brothers.

In 1942, Grimes left the group and was replaced by Mifflin "Pee Wee" Branford for the spot of First Tenor. They did not record anything in 1942 but continued to make appearance for the next two years even after Austin Powell was drafted in 1943. While serving his country he was replaced by Hank Haslett briefly before Herbie Mills returned to the group.  The lack of recordings may also be due to the 1942-1944 musicians' union strike.

In 1944, the Regis/Manor group of labels signed the Cats and the Fiddle where they re-recorded "I Miss You So" led by Ernie Price. Austin Powell then returned in 1946 to lead the group in "That's My Desire", which was later redone by the Channels in 1957. In 1947, Pee Wee Branford was replaced by Emmitt Slay briefly, until Johnny Davis took over the spot of First Tenor permanently. In 1948, a fifth member, Shirley Moore, was added to the group. Moore recorded four tracks with the group before being replaced by Doris Knighton.

In 1950, the Cats And The Fiddle recorded "I'll Never, Never Let You Go" with Gotham Records and "Wine Drinker" with Decca Records. They disbanded in 1951 and Powell formed the Austin Powell Quintet, which consisted of former Cats And The Fiddle members Johnny Davis, Stanley Gaines (Bass), Doris Knighton, as well as Beryl Booker, and Dottie Smith. They recorded two singles, "Some Other Spring" b/w "All This Can't Be True" and "Wishing Well" b/w "Please Consider Me" with Decca before disbanding about a year later.

Discography 

BLUEBIRD
8216 Nuts To You/Killin' Jive - 8/39
8248 Gang Busters/Please Don't Leave Me Now - 9/39
10484 Killer Diller Man From The South/Thursday Evening Swing - 11/39
10547 We Cats Will Swing For You/Till The Day I Die - 12/39
8402 Chant Of The Rain/I'd Rather Drink Muddy Water - 4/40
8429 I Miss You So/Public Jitterbug No. 1 - 5/40
8443 When I Grow Too Old To Dream/Left With The Thought Of You - 5/40
8465 Mister Rhythm Man/Gone - 6/40
8489 That's On, Jack, That's On/Just A Roamer - 8/40
8519 Hep Cats Holiday/In The Midst Of A Dream - 9/40
8535 Nothing/That's All I Mean To You - 10/40
8560 You're So Fine/Pig's Idea - 11/40
8585 Hush-A-Bye Love/Swing The Scales - 12/40
8639 I'll Always Love You Just The Same/One Is Never Too Old To Swing - 2/41
8665 If I Dream Of You/I'm Gonna Pull My Hair - 4/41
8685 I'm Singing (So Help Me)/My Darling - 5/41
8705 Crawlin' Blues/Until I Met You - 5/41
8847 I Don't Want To Set The World On Fire/Blue Skies - 11/41
8870 Lawdy-Clawdy/Sighing And Crying - 12/41
8902 Another Day/Stomp Stomp - 1/42
8932 Part Of me/Life's Too Short - 2/42
 
MONTGOMERY WARD (Bluebird masters, leased from Victor)
8519 Killer Diller Man From The South/Thursday Evening Swing - 1940
8520 We Cats Will Swing For You/Till The Day I Die - 1940
8521 Chant Of The Rain/I'd Rather Drink Muddy Water - 1940
8767 I Miss You So/Public Jitterbug No. 1 - 1940
8768 When I Grow Too Old To Dream/Left With The Thought Of You - 1940
8769 Mister Rhythm Man/Gone - 1940
8770 That's On, Jack, That's On/Just A Roamer - 1940
8904 You're So Fine/Pig's Idea - 1941
8905 Hush-A-Bye Love/Swing The Scales - 1941
 
REGIS (subsidiary of Manor)
6000 I Miss You So/My Sugar's Sweet To Me - 2/46
 
MANOR
1023 Life's Too Short/Romance Without Finance - 6/46
1037 Please Don't Leave Me Now/Shorty's Got To Go - 8/46
1038 J.D Blues/Gin Misery Blues [backing June Davis] - 8/46
1045 I'd Rather Drink Muddy Water/[Walkie Talkie - Rudy Richardson Trio] - 12/46
 
RCA VICTOR (Bluebird reissues)
20-2072 I Miss You So/[Dig These Blues - 4 Clefs] - 12/46

MANOR
1064 That's My Desire/When Elephants Roost In Bamboo Trees - 3/47
1067 They Don't Understand/I'm Stuck With You - 3/47
1078 Where Are You/I'm Gonna Pull My Hair - 7/47
1086 You're So Fine/Darling Can't We Make A Date - 8/47
6000 I Miss You So/My Sugar's Sweet To Me - ca. mid-47
 
RCA VICTOR (Bluebird reissues)
20-2794 Gang Busters/Please Don't Leave Me Now - 1/48
20-2795 Chant Of The Rain/I'd Rather Drink Muddy Water - 1/48
 
MANOR
1112 Honey Honey Honey/I'm Afraid Of You - 2/48
1140 That's What I Thought You Said/The New Look Blues - 9/48

RCA VICTOR (Bluebird reissues)
20-3260 If I Dream Of You/I'm Gonna Pull My Hair - 12/48
 
GOTHAM
197 I'll Never, Never Let You Go/Start Talking, Baby - 9/49
239 Do You Love Me/Movin' Out Today - 4/50
 
ARCO (Manor reissues)
1265 I Miss You So/My Sugar's Sweet To Me - 1950
 
RCA VICTOR (Bluebird reissues)
50-0077 I Miss You So/[Dig These Blues - 4 Clefs] - 1950
 
Decca Records
48151 Wine Drinker/Lover Boy - 5/50
 
Decca (as the "Austin Powell Quintet")
48206 Some Other Spring/All This Can't Be True - 4/51
48251 Wishing Well/Please Consider Me - 9/51
 
RCA VICTOR (Bluebird reissues)
47-4393 I Miss You So/Another Day - 11/51
447-0077 I Miss You So/[Dig These Blues - 4 Clefs] - 1955

References 

American vocal groups
Musical groups from Chicago
African-American musical groups
American jazz singers
Traditional pop music singers
American rhythm and blues musical groups
Jazz musicians from Illinois